Christian personal law or family law regulates adoption, divorce, guardianship, marriage and succession in India. The provisions of canon law concerning marriage are recognised as the personal law of Catholics in India (except in the state of Goa). Marriages of Indian Catholics (except in the state of Goa) are regulated by the Indian Christian Marriage Act, 1872. Christian Personal Law is not applicable in the state of Goa. The Goa civil code, also called the Goa Family Law, is the set of civil laws that regulate the residents of the Indian state of Goa. In India, as a whole, there are religion-specific civil codes that separately govern adherents of different religions. Goa is an exception to that rule in that a single secular code/law governs all Goans, irrespective of religion, ethnicity or linguistic affiliation.

Adoption

Christians in India can adopt children by resorting to section 41 of the Juvenile Justice (Care and Protection of Children) Act 2006 read with the Guidelines and Rules issued by various State Governments.

Divorce

Both husband and wife can seek a divorce on the grounds of:
 Adultery
 Cruelty
 Desertion for more than seven years
 Insanity for more than two years
 Incurable leprosy for more than two years
 Conversion to another religion
 Willful refusal to consummate the marriage
 Not being heard of for 7 years
 Venereal disease in communicable form for two years
 Failure to obey the order for restitution of conjugal rights

However, the wife can additionally sue for divorce on the grounds of:
 Rape
 Sodomy
 Bestiality

Guardianship

Christians in India are governed generally by the provisions of the Guardians and Wards Act (Central Act No 8 of 1890) in matters relating to guardianship of minors in respect of their person and property.

Marriage

Christian Marriage in India is regulated by the Indian Christian Marriage Act of 1872. The Law applies to the entirety of India except for the territories which, immediately before 1 November 1956, formed the states of Travancore-Cochin, Manipur and Jammu and Kashmir. Therefore, the act does not apply to marriages of Christians solemnised in the territories of the former states of Travancore and Cochin which now form part of Kerala.
 
The Tamil Nadu Legislature, via its Act No 27 of 1995 Dated 22/09/1995, extended the Indian Christian Marriage Act 1872 to the territories of Kanyakumari District and Sengottai Thaluk which were transferred to Tamil Nadu after the reorganization of Indian States. However, civil marriages among Christians in the former princely state of Cochin are regulated by the provisions of the Cochin Christian Civil Marriage Act 1095 ME. Civil marriages among Christians in the Jammu and Kashmir are regulated by The Jammu and Kashmir Christian Marriage and Divorce Act, 1957. There is no statute regulating solemnisation of marriages among Christians in Manipur, rather customary law or personal law prevails there.

Succession

The Indian Succession Act of 1865 was comprehensively amended and consolidated by the Indian Succession Act of 1925. Neither the Indian Succession Act of 1865, nor the Act of 1925 was to apply to Christians in the whole of India.

See also
Hindu personal law
Muslim personal law
 The Prohibition of Child Marriage Act, 2006
 Hindu Marriage Act, 1955
 Muslim Women (Protection of Rights on Divorce) Act 1986
Special Marriage Act, 1954

References

Indian family law
Legislation in British India
Christianity in India
Christian law